QBIK is a Swedish football team from Karlstad. In 2005 they achieved promotion to the Damallsvenskan, which is the women's premier division. The team narrowly missed relegation with a 10th place, but was relegated in 2007 having finished in last 12th place. In 2016 they were relegated one more level down. The club was established in 1978.

QBIK play their home games at Tingvalla Stadium in Karlstad.

Attendances
In recent seasons QBIK have had the following average attendances:

Footnotes

External links
 QBIK – Official website 

 
Women's football clubs in Sweden
Association football clubs established in 1978
Sport in Karlstad
1978 establishments in Sweden